Leroy Jones may refer to:

Leroy Jones (American football) (1950–2021), American football player in the United States and Canada 
Leroy Jones (boxer) (1950–2010), heavyweight
Leroy Jones (trumpeter) (born 1958), American jazz musician
LeRoy J. Jones Jr. (born 1957), American politician

See also
Leroi Jones or Amiri Baraka (1934–2014), American writer of poetry, drama, fiction, essays and music criticism